John Jurewicz is a Polish-American artist specializing in painting Byzantine icons and frescoes. John is the son of Fr. Theodore Jurewicz, an Orthodox old-rite priest and artist specializing in the same field of visual art.

Jurewicz grew up in Erie, Pennsylvania, the eighth of ten children in his family. He now lives in Chicago with his artist wife, Irene, an immigrant from Russia, and two daughters. John began painting icons alongside his father and traveled the United States working with him to work on projects. Jurewicz continues this tradition as his family journeys to Orthodox congregations to paint them. Jurewicz's independent work is concentrated in the Midwest, including Illinois and Indiana, as well as at a church in Dallas, Texas.

References

External links
Video featuring John Jurewicz's artwork on NWITV from the Times of Northwest Indiana
Article published in the Times of Northwest Indiana on John Jurewicz and his artwork

Artists from Chicago
Icon painters
21st-century Polish painters
Eastern Orthodox Christians from Poland
20th-century American painters
American male painters
21st-century American painters
21st-century American male artists
American people of Polish descent
Living people
Old Believer movement
Fresco painters
Russian Orthodox Christians from the United States
Year of birth missing (living people)
Polish male painters
20th-century American male artists